The Carlton Showband is a Canadian musical group of the Irish genre. Formed in Brampton, Ontario in November 1963, the band initially named themselves the Carlton Danceband in reference to Toronto's Carlton Street where Maple Leaf Gardens was located.

History
The initial recording lineup included 5 musicians from Ireland: Chris O'Toole (leader), Christy McLaughlin, Mike Feeney, Seamus Grew, Sean McManus, and Fred White (the lone Canadian, from Nova Scotia). By their second album release, Irishmen Johnny Patterson and Mitch McCoy were added. The band's album, The Merry Ploughboy, was the first Canadian album to be released on cassette tape.

McCoy departed after 2 years, replaced by Bob Lewis (of Nova Scotia). This would be the usual lineup from about 1968 through the mid-70s. The band released a number of albums through the RCA label, including Gospel Favourites, which sold more than 200,000 copies.

In 1967 the group became the regular band on The Pig and Whistle, a CTV television musical variety show that continued to air until 1977, and in 1969 they recorded an album of music from the show, Carlton Showband at the Pig 'n' Whistle. The band performed frequently in Newfoundland. In 1971 they toured the Maritimes and won a Gold Leaf award for their album Best of the Carlton Showband.

Despite the end of their regular national television series exposure, the band continued to perform; McManus died 1989;. In 1996 the group disbanded, although Fred White continued to do the occasional show using the Carlton Showband name. Between 2000 and 2010 the group remained inactive.  O'Toole died in 2005; Patterson in 2007; Lewis in 2008. In 2010, White, Aaron Lewis, Larris and Robert Benoit, Greg Donaghey of Sion Mills, Northern Ireland, and Roddie Lee revived the group for a reunion tour.

Feeney died in 2011, and McLaughlin in 2014. As of 2018 Grew and White are the surviving members from the regular 1960s lineup.

Discography

Albums

Singles

Awards and recognition
1975: winner, Juno Award, Country Group or Duo of the Year
1980: nominee, Juno Award, Country Group or Duo of the Year
1981: nominee, Juno Award, Country Group or Duo of the Year

References

External links
The Carlton Showband Official Homepage
The Canadian Encyclopedia: Carlton Showband
Jam!: Carlton Showband

Canadian country music groups
Canadian folk music groups
Juno Award winners
Musical groups established in 1963
Musical groups disestablished in 1996
1963 establishments in Ontario
Musical groups from Brampton